Midea is a village and a former municipality in Argolis, Peloponnese, Greece. It was named Gerbesi (Γκέρμπεσι) until 1928. Since the 2011 local government reform it is part of the municipality Nafplio, of which it is a municipal unit. The municipal unit has an area of 178.306 km2, and a population of 5,631 (2011). The seat of the municipality was in Agia Triada.

Within the boundaries of the municipal unit are two significant archaeological sites dating to the Bronze Age or earlier. One is the site of Dendra located outside the village of the same name. The other is the citadel site of Midea. Both sites were originally excavated by the archaeologist Axel W. Persson between the 1920s and World War II.

References

Populated places in Argolis